Wallasey Village railway station serves the Wallasey Village suburb of Wallasey, in Merseyside, England. It is situated on the Wirral Line 6¼ miles (9 km) west of Liverpool Lime Street on the Merseyrail network.

History
The station was built on the Wirral Railway's route from Birkenhead Park to New Brighton, opening in 1907 under the name Leasowe Road. Through services via the Mersey Railway Tunnel to Liverpool commenced when the line was electrified in 1938 by the London, Midland and Scottish Railway. The station was rebuilt following extensive damage during World War II.

Facilities
The station is staffed, during all opening hours, and has platform CCTV. There is a payphone on platform 1, a booking office, live departure and arrival screens, for passenger information, and each of the two platforms has a waiting room. Being close to the centre of Wallasey Village, itself, the station does not have a free car park or a cycle rack. There is no access, to the platform, for passengers with wheelchairs or prams, as access is by staircase only. In 2006, according to a Transport 2000 survey, the station was considered as a weak link, with regard to access. As yet, platform access has not been modernised to the standard of that at Hooton.

Services
Current service levels are every 15 minutes to Liverpool and New Brighton during Monday to Saturday daytime, and every 30 minutes at other times. These services are all provided by Merseyrail's fleet of Class 507 and Class 508 EMUs.

The station connects to the major bus routes on Leasowe Road.

Gallery

References

Sources

External links

Railway stations in the Metropolitan Borough of Wirral
DfT Category E stations
Former Wirral Railway stations
Railway stations in Great Britain opened in 1907
Railway stations served by Merseyrail
Wallasey